Luis Gabriel Rey Villamizar (February 20, 1980) is a Colombian former professional footballer who last played for Liga MX club Monarcas Morelia on loan from Club América.

A classical left-footed striker, Rey arrived to Mexico in 2001 and has scored over 150 goals in Liga MX. He holds Mexican citizenship. Nicknamed in Mexico as El Canguro (Spanish for kangaroo) due to his goal celebrations, he was part of the Colombia national team and played the Copa América 2007.

Career

Early career
Rey debuted in 2000 with Atlético Bucaramanga, where he remained for one year, moved to Mexico and was transferred to Segundo Division clubs such as Lobos BUAP, Zitacuaro, and Acapulco; eventually he switched to Atlante FC.

Atlante
While at the club, he reaped great success as goalscorer, winning the league's Gold Boot, achieved in the 2003 Apertura, becoming the first Colombian to win that distinction in Mexico soccer. In his first stint with Atlante, Rey scored 43 goals in 76 appearances.

Morelia
In 2005, Rey signed with Monarcas Morelia where he managed to score 26 goals in 88 appearances from 2005 to 2007.

Pachuca
For the Apertura 2007, Rey was purchased by recently crowned champions Pachuca, along with Rafael Márquez Lugo, in a trade for Luis Angel Landin. Rey scored a three goals against Tigres UANL. Rey returned to Atlante to play the Apertura 2008, after scoring five goals in 34 matches.

Return to Morelia
During the 2009 Draft it was announced that Rey would return to Monarcas Morelia. While in preseason with the club in Zihuatanejo, Guerrero, Rey picked up an injury that would prevent him from playing the first match of the season. He would not reappeared until matchday six, against Atlas and score his first goal against UANL. In November 2009 Rey would score what he considers "the best goal of his career" against Club Deportivo Guadalajara at the Estadio Morelos. After a cross from teammate Jaime Duran, Rey attempted a successful bicycle-kick which beat goalkeeper Luis Ernesto Michel.

Jaguares de Chiapas
For the Apertura 2011, Rey was transferred to Jaguares de Chiapas, club in which he scored his 100th goal in the Mexican top-flight in the first match of the tournament against Monterrey. Appearing in over 70 matches and scoring 33 goals, Rey is one of the top goal-scorers  in the club's history.

América
On June 5, 2013, Rey was signed by recently crowned league champions América. He scored his first goal for América on September 2 in the 4–1 win over UNAM. On 2015, Rey moved to Puebla FC.

Puebla
Puebla signed Rey in a season-long loan deal from Club América. Rey played a total of 38 games between Liga MX and the Copa MX, having scored a total of 11 goals in both competitions. At the end of the Apertura 2015 he returned with Club América.

Back on loan to Monarcas Morelia
On 9 December 2015, Monarcas Morelia announced that they had reached an agreement with Club América for the loan of Luis Gabriel Rey.

International Goals

Honors

Club
Pachuca
North American SuperLiga: 2007
CONCACAF Champions' Cup: 2008

Atlante
CONCACAF Champions League: 2008–09

Morelia
North American SuperLiga: 2010

América
Liga MX: Apertura 2014

Puebla
Copa MX: Clausura 2015
Supercopa MX: 2015

Individual
Mexican Primera División top scorer: Apertura 2003

References

External links

1980 births
Living people
People from Bucaramanga
Colombian footballers
Colombia international footballers
Colombian emigrants to Mexico
Naturalized citizens of Mexico
Atlético Bucaramanga footballers
Lobos BUAP footballers
Atlante F.C. footballers
Atlético Morelia players
C.F. Pachuca players
Chiapas F.C. footballers
Club Puebla players
Club América footballers
2007 Copa América players
Liga MX players
Colombian expatriate footballers
Expatriate footballers in Mexico
Association football forwards
Sportspeople from Santander Department